Kiel Glacier is a broad, heavily crevassed glacier descending southwest from Edward VII Peninsula, Antarctica, just east of the Rockefeller Mountains. The glacier was partially delineated from aerial photographs obtained by the Byrd Antarctic Expedition (1928–30) and subsequently was observed from the air by several U.S. expeditions to the area. It is named for driver Max R. Kiel, U.S. Navy, of the Mobile Construction Battalion, who lost his life on March 5, 1956, when his tractor fell into a crevasse about  westward of this glacier while attempting to establish a trail to Byrd Station.

See also
 List of glaciers in the Antarctic
 Glaciology

References

Glaciers of King Edward VII Land